Scott Christopher (born January 13, 1967) is an American film and television actor known for his roles in The Best Two Years and Granite Flats.

Early life
Christopher was born in Ferndale, Michigan, on January 13, 1967. He moved with his family to Utah when he was eleven years old. After playing Atticus Finch in To Kill a Mockingbird his sophomore year at Mountain View High School, Scott was introduced to a new drama director named Charles Lynn Frost in 1982 at the start of his junior year. A strong mentorship grew between the two as Christopher was encouraged to build upon his desire to become a successful stage actor. As a junior, was chosen by Frost for lead roles such as Norman Cornell in Neil Simon's Star Spangled Girl, and Nathan Detroit in Frank Loesser's Guys and Dolls. As a senior, he managed both comedy and drama as Henry Higgins in Lerner & Lowe's My Fair Lady, and Tom Wingfield in Tennessee Williams's The Glass Menagerie. Between being on the big stage, Scott also competed at the region and state level, aiding the class of 1984 to obtain the highest cumulative score that had ever been achieved by a high school team in a state competition.
He studied at Brigham Young University, winning the Irene Ryan Award at the Kennedy Center in Washington, D.C., an award annually presented to the nation's top collegiate actor.

Career
Christopher played "The Movie Guy," the irreverent late-night host of a long-running TV program on KJZZ TV, Salt Lake City. He was for a time a morning radio personality in Salt Lake City and also in Monterey, California. Christopher was director of speaking and training at OC Tanner Company for nearly a decade and has authored several business books. He is also a keynote speaker.

Personal life
Christopher is a member of the Church of Jesus Christ of Latter-day Saints and has served as a bishop. Apart from acting, he is a management consultant and author. His works include The Levity Effect and People People. Christopher and his wife Elizabeth are the parents of five children.

Filmography

Sources
http://www.scottchristopher.net

References

 

1967 births
People from Ferndale, Michigan
Latter Day Saints from Utah
Brigham Young University alumni
American male television actors
American male film actors
Living people
Male actors from Detroit
American male writers
21st-century American writers
Latter Day Saints from Michigan
Latter Day Saints from California